Phaenomonas longissima, also known as the short-maned sand eel in St. Helena, is an eel in the family Ophichthidae (worm/snake eels). It was described by Jean Cadenat and Émile Marchal in 1963, originally under the genus Callechelys. It is a marine, tropical eel which is known from the Atlantic Ocean, including Ascension Island, St. Helena, Brazil, Senegal, Ghana, and Cape Verde.

References

Ophichthidae
Fish of the Atlantic Ocean
Fish described in 1963
Taxa named by Jean Cadenat